Typhoon Treasure is a 1938 Australian adventure film directed by Noel Monkman and starring Campbell Copelin, Gwen Munro, and Joe Valli. It is set in New Guinea although shot on the Great Barrier Reef and the Queensland coast. It was Monkman's first dramatic feature film after several years making documentaries.

Premise
Alan Richards is the sole survivor of a pearling lugger which has been shipwrecked on Pakema Reef during a typhoon. He sets out to recover some pearls which went missing in the wreck, crossing through the jungle and fighting headhunters.

Cast
Campbell Copelin as Alan Richards
Gwen Munro as Jean Roberts
Joe Valli as Scotty McLeod
Douglas Herald as Buck Thompson
Kenneth Brampton as Alfred Webb
Norman French as patrol officer
Utan Walters as Utan
Marshall Crosby
Moncrieff Macallum
Ossie Wenban
Douglas Channell
Benjamin Brown

Production

Development
In the mid-1930s, Noel Monkman was working with F. W. Thring making documentaries. Thring offered to back Monkman in making a dramatic feature, and provided him with a writer, John P. McLeod.

In June 1935 Monkman announced he and Alan Mill had bought the film rights to a novel, A Recipe in Rubber by Robert Stock. It would be filmed as The Gloved Hand.

By August 1935 Monkma announced he would make Typhoon Treasure rather than A Recipe in Rubber. Joe Valli signed on to play a lead role that month.

Thring planned to make the movie after visiting Hollywood in 1936 but died that year.

Cinesound Productions offered to buy the script but Monkman elected to make it himself. He formed a syndicate with Bruce Cummings and Commonwealth Laboratories, who provided the crew.

Shooting
Filming commenced June 1937. The film was shot mostly on location in North Queensland, on the Great Barrier Reef, the Yorke Peninsula and Torres Strait. Joe Valli started filming in June but Gwen Munro did not arrive until October.

Torres Strait Islander Utan had a key role.

After the location work was completed, some studio scenes were filmed at Commonwealth Film Laboratories' studio at the Sydney Showground.

Music was collated from popular classics including Tchaikovsky's Swan Lake.

Death of crew member
While filming underwater scenes on Green Island in October, one of the divers, James Bell, died of myocarditis. Bruce Cummings, who was in charge of underwater photography, went down in a diving cylinder, followed a few minutes later by Bell, who was his assistant. A few minutes later Cummings noticed something was wrong with Bell. When they brought him to the surface he was dead. An inquest was later held which found no negligence.

Release
Reviews generally found the story formulaic but enjoyed the direction and settings.

It was sold to America and a shortened version of the film screened in England in 1943. In the 1950s rights to the film were bought by George Maclolm who cut it down to 40 minutes and reissued it as The Perils of Pakema Reef.

References

External links

Typhoon Treasure at National Film and Sound Archive
Typhoon Treasure at Oz Movies

1938 films
Australian black-and-white films
1938 adventure films
Australian adventure films
1930s English-language films